Du bist min (Ein deutsches Tagebuch) is an East German film. It was released in 1969.

External links
 

1969 films
East German films
1960s German-language films
German documentary films
Films directed by Andrew Thorndike
1960s German films